Jicalapa Airport  is an airport serving the town of Gualaco in Olancho Department, Honduras.

There are hills north through east of the airport.

See also

 Transport in Honduras
 List of airports in Honduras

References

External links
 FallingRain - Jicalapa
 HERE Maps - Gualaco
 OpenStreetMap - Jicalapa
 OurAirports - Jicalapa
 Skyvector Aeronautical Charts - Jicalapa

Airports in Honduras
Olancho Department